The Longest Way is a 2009 viral video uploaded by Christoph Rehage. The video features Rehage walking 4646 km (2887 miles) from Beijing to Ürümqi during 2007 and 2008. 

Rehage originally set himself a goal to walk from Beijing, China and reach his hometown of Bad Nenndorf, Germany. The walk featured in the video started in November 2007 but he stopped and withdrew from the walk in October 2008. On deciding to stop, Rehage stated "I wanted to gain back my life. I had to regain control over myself." He later walked on his longest way trail in Georgia.

The video used to be titled The Longest Way 1.0 - walk through China and grow a beard! - a photo every day timelapse, but is now titled THE LONGEST WAY 1.0 - 350 days of hiking through China - TIMELAPSE. It has received over 50 million views, as of August 2022. TIME listed the video as the #8 top viral video of 2009.

References

External links
 
 Christoph Rehage's website

Viral videos
2009 films
2009 YouTube videos
Internet documentary films
German short documentary films
2009 documentary films
Films set in China
2000s German films